Dom & Roland is the alias of British drum and bass producer Dominic Angas. The addition of "Roland" in the artist name refers to his Roland sampler. In 1996 he was signed to Moving Shadow recordings, releasing three albums and numerous singles on the label. He has released records on other labels including 31 Records, Prototype, and Renegade Hardware, and has collaborated with Kemal, Black Sun Empire, Noisia, Hive, Amon Tobin, Keaton, and Skynet.

He set up his own label called Dom & Roland Productions (DRP) in 2005. He is credited with creating the tramen breakbeat which was one of the most widely used breaks in Drum & Bass, popularized by DJ Trace among many others.

 Industry (1998)
 Back for the Future (2002)
 Chronology (2004)
 Through the Looking Glass (2008)
 No Strings Attached (2009)
 The Big Bang (2011)
 Last Refuge of a Scoundrel (2016)
 Lost in the Moment (2020)

References

External links
 
 

British drum and bass music groups
English electronic music groups